Below is a list of populated places in Martakert Province, in the Republic of Artsakh. While the province is de facto in Artsakh, it is, de jure part of the Republic of Azerbaijan.

 Ağdamkənd
 Aliağalı
 Bağbanlar, Agdam
 Baş Günəypəyə
 Baş Qərvənd
 Boyəhmədli
 Bozavend
 Cavahirli
 Chapar, Nagorno-Karabakh
 Drmbon, Nagorno-Karabakh
 Kusapat
 Martakert
 Mehmana
 Nor Ghazanchi, Nagorno-Karabakh
 Umudlu, Nagorno-Karabakh
 Vank, Nagorno-Karabakh

Populated places in Martakert Province